John George Burnett, OBE (1876–1962) was Unionist MP for Aberdeen North from 1931 to 1935, defeating William Wedgwood Benn at the 1931 general election.  He was awarded his OBE in the New Years Honours List of 1946 for his services as County Army Welfare Officer for Aberdeenshire and Kincardineshire.

He lost his seat in 1935 to Mr George M. Garro-Jones (Labour)

References

1876 births
1962 deaths
Members of the Parliament of the United Kingdom for Aberdeen constituencies
UK MPs 1931–1935
Unionist Party (Scotland) MPs
Officers of the Order of the British Empire